New Orleans Jazz may refer to:

Dixieland, a style of jazz music (New Orleans Jazz)

New Orleans Jazz (NBA team), professional basketball team that relocated and became the Utah Jazz
New Orleans Jazz football club, an American football team in the Stars Football League
New Orleans Jazz National Historical Park